CFOA may refer to the following:

Chemins de Fer Ottomans d'Anatolie - An Ottoman railway company.
Chief Fire Officers Association
Certified Futures and Options Analyst - A financial professional certification.